Megachile albisecta is a species of leafcutter bee in the family Megachilidae. This species is present in the Southern Europe, in the East Palaearctic ecozone and in North Africa.

References
 Biolib
 Fauna Europaea

albisecta
Hymenoptera of Africa
Hymenoptera of Europe
Insects of North Africa
Insects described in 1817